The 2021 Clásica de Almería was the 36th edition of the Clásica de Almería road cycling one day race. It was held on 14 February 2021 as part of the 2021 UCI Europe Tour and the 2021 UCI ProSeries.

Teams 
Eleven UCI WorldTeams and eleven UCI ProTeams make up the twenty-two teams that participated in the race. Each team entered seven riders, for a total of 154 riders, of which 143 finished.

UCI WorldTeams

 
 
 
 
 
 
 
 
 
 
 

UCI ProTeams

Result

References 

2021
Clásica de Almería
Clásica de Almería
Clásica de Almería
Clásica de Almería